Vicente Brugat (born 27 November 1947) is a Spanish water polo player. He competed in the men's tournament at the 1968 Summer Olympics.

See also
 Spain men's Olympic water polo team records and statistics
 List of men's Olympic water polo tournament goalkeepers

References

External links
 

1947 births
Living people
Water polo players from Barcelona
Spanish male water polo players
Water polo goalkeepers
Olympic water polo players of Spain
Water polo players at the 1968 Summer Olympics
20th-century Spanish people